Heteroboranes are classes of boranes, at least one boron atom is replaced by another element. Like many of the related boranes, these clusters are polyhedra and are similarly classified as closo-, nido-, arachno-, hypho-, according to the so-called electron count. Closo- represents a complete  polyhedron, while nido-, arachno- and hypho- stand for polyhedrons that are missing one, two and three vertices.

Structurally, various heteroboranes can be derived from the icosahedral (Ih) B12H122– via formal replacement of its BH fragments with isoelectronic CH+, P+ or S2+ fragments, e.g. closo-1-CB11H12–, closo-1,2-C2B10H12, closo-1,2-P2B10H10 or closo-1-SB11H11.

See also 
 Carborane
 Azaborane

References

Boron compounds
Cluster chemistry
Boranes